This Queen Anne Victorian house, designed by the prominent architects Comstock and Trotsche, was built in 1888. It was the last residence of inventor Henry Timken (1831-1909).  Henry Timken Jr. (grandson of inventor Henry Timken), along with the Putnam sisters, co-founded the Timken Museum of Art in Balboa Park, a short distance from the home.  The Timken House became a private residence in 1965.

References 

Houses in San Diego County, California
Historic houses